Giovanni Angelo Fontana (born 1 April 1944) is an Italian politician and lawyer.

Biography
Born in Verona, Fontana graduated in law from the University of Modena and Reggio Emilia. He was elected for the first time in Parliament in 1972. He also served many times as Undersecretary to the Ministries of Public Works, Transport and Industry. 

On 28 June 1992, he was appointed Minister of Agriculture and Forestry in the first Amato government, but he resigned on 21 March 1993, the guarantee notice for handling stolen goods and violating the law on party financing.

On 30 March 2012, the National Council of Christian Democracy, convened on the initiative of Clelio Darida and 48 other national councilors who held this role in 1994, elected Giovanni Angelo Fontana to the office of national secretary of the party. The XIX Congress of the DC, held on 10 and 11 November 2012, confirmed Fontana as party secretary. In 2018 Fontana was succeeded by Renato Grassi as secretary of DC and he became President of National Council of the party.

References

External links
Personal website

1944 births
Living people
Christian Democracy (Italy) politicians
Deputies of Legislature VI of Italy
Deputies of Legislature VII of Italy
Deputies of Legislature VIII of Italy
Deputies of Legislature IX of Italy
Senators of Legislature X of Italy
Deputies of Legislature XI of Italy
Politicians of Veneto